The WWE European Championship is a former professional wrestling title competed for in World Wrestling Entertainment (WWE). The title was created on February 26, 1997. The first champion was The British Bulldog who defeated Owen Hart in a tournament final. The title was retired briefly in April 1999 by then-champion Shane McMahon, who wanted to retire as an "undefeated champion". McMahon reintroduced the championship two months later and gave it to Mideon, who saw the title belt in Shane's travel bag and asked if he could have it. The title was finally retired on July 22, 2002, when WWE Intercontinental Champion Rob Van Dam defeated European Champion Jeff Hardy to unify the European title into the Intercontinental title. There have been a total of 27 recognized champions who have had a combined 37 official reigns. This is a chronological list of wrestlers that have been WWE European Champion by ring name.

Reigns

Names

Reigns

Combined reigns

See also
 List of former championships in WWE

References

External links
 Official European Championship Title History
 WWE European Championship history at Wrestling-Titles.com

WWE championships lists